Ion Costaș (born 22 February 1944) is a Moldovan military officer and a former minister of interior (1990–1992) and Defence (1992).

He is a leader of the Democratic Forum of Romanians in Moldova.

Biography

Ion Costaş was born in 1944 in the village of Țarigrad (Drochia District) in a peasant family of Romanian ethnicity. Between 1949 and 1957, he was with his parents in Kazakhstan, where they had been deported following conviction of 25 years of hard labor (being accused of being accomplice with fascists). He graduated Higher Military Aviation School from Kharkiv (1967), Gagarin Air Force Academy in Moscow (1976) and the Police Academy in Moscow.

During 1967 to 1984, he worked as aviation officer in the Soviet Army, first as a Mi-8 helicopter pilot (1967), squadron commander (1976–1978) and then as deputy commander of joined troops (1978–1980). Becomes regimental commander (1980–1983), with 102 fighters under his direction and then deputy commander of the 14th Army (Soviet Union) on aviation issues.

In 1984, was appointed deputy commander DOSAAF (Volunteer Society for Cooperation with the Army, Aviation, and Fleet) RSS Moldavia (Moldavian Soviet Socialist Republic), and the following year became commander of the Central Committee of DOSAAF, holding this position until in 1990. He was promoted in October 1988 to the rank of Major-General of the Soviet Army aviation.

In 1990, he was appointed Chairman of Committee Supreme Soviet of RSS Moldavia for State Security and Military Affairs, and in September 1990—a member of the Presidential Council of the Republic of Moldova. Between 1990 and 1992, General Ion Costaş served as Minister of Internal Affairs in the Government of Moldova.

State by Presidential Decree no. 20 of 5 February 1992, Division General Ion Costaş was appointed as the first Minister of Defence of the Republic, but was dismissed (along with Anatol Plugaru, Security Minister) after Moldovan troops lost the fighting to restore part of Moldova Transnistria against Transnistrian paramilitary troops and 14th Russian Army, led by General Aleksandr Lebed.

He was then appointed as military attaché in Romania, where he was recalled in October 1993 and went into reserve.

Ion Costaş was awarded the order "Service in the armed forces of their native country" grade III with 6 medals. On 24 February 2010, the Minister of Internal Affairs, General Victor Catan, Gen. Ion Costaş was decorated with "The Cross of Merit", the highest distinction of the MIA with occasion of celebrating of his birthday.

After retiring from politics in 1993, Ion Costas has entered the business sector. He is currently the general manager of Crystal System, an international group specialized in Information Technology. He was previously a regional manager for Hewlett Packard and for the Petrom, a large Romanian oil company. He led the contingent of veterans of the Transnistrian War on Great National Assembly Square during the 2011 Chișinău Independence Day Parade.

In 2020, Costaș announced that he would run in the 2020 Moldovan presidential election as an independent candidate because there was no party "for the country and for the nation". He submitted the necessary documents for his participation to the Central Election Commission of Moldova (CEC) on 2 September. However, on 29 September, Costaș announced that he would withdraw his candidacy due to the "violation by state institutions of the constitutional provisions regarding the election of the president" and urged other candidates to do the same.

See also 
 War of Transnistria
 Timeline of events in the War of Transnistria
 Moldovan parliamentary election from 1990

References

External links
  Online resource Moldova.org - Ион Косташ: "Была Война!", события 1990-1992 годов на Днестре

1944 births
Living people
Moldovan Ministers of Defense
Moldovan Ministers of the Interior
Moldovan MPs 1990–1994
Moldovan generals
Moldovan people of Romanian descent